Sisai refers to a village in Siwan district, in Bihar, India 

It also refers to: 

 Sisai, Hisar, an Indus Valley Civilisation site and a village in Haryana, India 
 Sisai block, a community development block in Jharkhand, India 
 Sisai, Gumla, a village in Jharkhand, India 
 Sisai (Vidhan Sabha constituency), a state assembly constituency in Jharkhand, India